Mehr-e-Taban Academy (Mehrschool)  in Shiraz, Iran was founded by Zahra Goorangi in 1993. Mehr-e-Taban Academy includes Mehr-e-Taban biliteracy-promoting school and Mehr-e-Taban international school. The school has three campuses in Shiraz and educates approximately 1500 students. Mehr-e-Taban offers education from kindergarten to grade 12.It is for both male and female and is one of the first schools in Shiraz witch their
main language is English rather than Persian.Students all around the world would feel connected with their teachers and classmates in a safe environment.

Mehr-e-Taban is an international baccalaureate world school and offers a curriculum in the Primary Years Programme, Middle Years Programme and Diploma Programme. Among international baccalaureate schools in Iran, Mehr-e-Taban International School is the first school that offers three educational programmes.

The academy`s name is taken from the book Mehr-e-Taban written by Seyed Mohammad Hossein Hosseini Tehrani.

Academic curriculum 

At Mehr-e-Taban Biliteracy-promoting School the students learn Persian education in full accordance with the requirements of the Iranian Department of Education. Moreover, they receive English in the afternoon. French is also offered as a subject from grade 6. Students participate in the IELTS test in grade 11 and are well equipped for entering universities both in Iran and abroad.

At Mehr-e-Taban International School the language of instruction is English and the school’s curriculum is based on international standards, providing students with comprehensive and thorough knowledge in all subject areas.

Activities 
The academy offers the following activities to students:

Music

Mehr e Taban music department has started its activities since 2013. The head of department is Mohammad Mehdi Goorangi.

Mehr radio

Mehr-e-Taban academy launched Mehr radio in 2006. Mehr radio is an internet radio that offers training podcasts to the audiences. Mehr radio is expanding its activities in the areas of school]] news, music, and radio show.

Mehr festival

This festival is held by Mehr-e-Taban Academy and includes arts, literature and culture. Mehr festival is considered for students of all grades.

Bahar festival

This festival is celebrated each February. Bahar consists of different competitions for students and parents, concerts, and devotion.

Passion play

Mehr-e-taban academy holds a big passion play about Imam Hossein each year in Muharram.  The play is arranged with the collaboration of above 200 students of different grades.

say No to a dangerous Chaharshanbe Suri' campaign

Islamic Republic News Agency reported that students in Shiraz signed a banner in support of say No to a dangerous Chaharshanbe Suri campaign and promised that on the evening of last Tuesday of the year they will not use firecrackers and explosives. According to IRNA, this banner has been signed by over 1500 students in Shiraz. On this banner which has been initiated by Mehr-e-Taban Academy, students, teachers and staff pledged and signed not to use firecrackers and explosives in commemoration of the Plasco event.

Facilities 

Mehr-e-Taban Academy provides the following facilities:

 Computers
 Library
 Laboratory
 Music

A few examples of honors of the academy 
Attaining the Khwarizmi festival in electronics major and qualifying for the country phase
Achieving the bronze medal of international young naturalists match
Achieving the silver medal of the world choir festival in Russia
Attaining the Ibn-e-Heysam festival at country phase

References

External links
 IB Official website
 Mehr Radio
 
 
 
 

Educational institutions established in 1993
International Baccalaureate schools in Iran
1993 establishments in Iran
High schools in Iran
Schools in Shiraz